A Little Princess (1986–1987) is a six-part British-American mini-series (based upon the 1905 novel A Little Princess by Frances Hodgson Burnett), directed by Carol Wiseman, and starring Amelia Shankley as Sara Crewe and Maureen Lipman as Miss Minchin. It was popular in Europe and Japan.

Plot
Sara Crewe, the daughter of wealthy British aristocrat Ralph Crewe, has spent her entire life living in India after the death of her mother. Knowing she needs proper European schooling, her father brings Sara to an elite boarding school in London where her mother had been educated. Crewe spares no expense ensuring Sara will be as comfortable as possible while she is there. Before bringing Sarah to England, Mr. Crewe lends his old friend, Carrisford, a significant amount of his fortune to invest in a diamond mine in Africa.

Sara and her father arrive in London and meet the school's owner and headmistress, Miss Minchin. After a tearful farewell, Sara's father departs and she begins her education. Sara quickly befriends the other students, including Lottie, a younger student Sara consoles for having lost her mother, and Irmengarde, a shy girl often made fun of for her weight, as well as the school's servant girl, Becky, who is ignored by everyone else. On the return trip, Mr. Crewe catches pneumonia. Arriving back at his estate in India, he receives a letter from Carrisford, telling him the diamond mine was empty, and his fortune has been lost. The stress of this worsens his illness and he dies soon after. In London, Miss Minchin is informed by Crewe's lawyer that she will be receiving no money henceforth due to Crewe's bankruptcy. Minchin has already amassed heavy expenses for Sara's birthday with lavish gifts and decorations, having hoped to extort more money from her father, and is furious when she finds out she'll have to pay for them out of her own pocket. Since Sara has no living relatives, Minchin considers throwing Sara out on the street, but is advised against this by Crewe's lawyer, who reminds her how poorly it would affect her reputation.

She decides to turn Sara into a servant, making her clean and work in the school where she was once a student. Sara is moved out of her luxurious room and sent to live in the attic with Becky. She continues to be kind and gracious to everyone, even to Miss Minchin, despite her dire circumstances and cruelty. One cold day, Sara is sent out to run errands and spots money on the ground. Cold and hungry, she uses it to buy six buns from a nearby bakery, giving five to a beggar girl she meets and leaving only one for herself.

Meanwhile, Mr. Crewe's friend, Carrisford, had received false reports about the diamond mine. It was, in fact, a great investment, making him very wealthy. Knowing that half of the diamond fortune belongs to his friend, he immediately tries to contact him. Upon finding that Crewe has died, Carrisford, distraught, begins searching for Sara. Carrisford has returned to England and actually lives right next door to Miss Minchin's school, but has never met Sara and assumes she is just a servant girl. Crewe never told him exactly where Sara was attending school, only that it was a boarding school in Europe which her mother had attended. Carrisford has his solicitor, Carmichael, whose children have constant interactions with Sara as they live opposite Miss Minchin's, start searching schools all over Europe in hopes of finding her. After searching numerous cities, including Paris, St. Petersburg, Lisbon, and Vienna, Carmichael says he cannot make any more trips himself. Carrisford remains guilt-ridden over what happened to his friend, and vows to keep looking until he finds Sara.

One morning, a monkey climbs into Sara's attic room. The monkey belongs to Ram Dass, Carrisford's Indian servant. Sara brings the monkey next door to return him, and remarks about Ram Dass being a Sikh, and how she met many Sikhs while growing up in India. When Carrisford asks how she came to be a servant at the school, she tells them how she used to be a pupil, but became a servant when a friend lost all of her father's money just before he died. Sara sees a statue of Kali in Carrisford's parlour, and says it looks just like one her father had owned. When Carrisford asks what her father's name was, she tells him, "Crewe...Ralph Crewe". Stunned, Carrisford tells her the statue actually was her father's, and that he is the friend whom it had been thought lost Ralph Crewe's fortune, and he has been searching all over Europe for her. Yet all this time, she had been just next door.

Carrisford tells Sara that half of his large fortune rightfully belongs to her, and that she doesn't have to return to the school. Miss Minchin arrives, assuming her servant to be bothering the neighbours, and demanding that she return to the school. Carmichael explains the situation, and chastises Minchin for her cruelty. Carrisford tells Sara that she is welcome to stay with him as long as she likes and that he will arrange private tutors to finish her schooling. Carrisford also rescues Becky, who becomes Sara's personal maid. They visit the bakery that Sara bought six buns from when she was a servant and meet the beggar girl who is now the bakers apprentice, the baker having taken her in after witnessing Sara's kind act. The girls greet each other with glee.

Cast
 Maureen Lipman as Miss Minchin
 Amelia Shankley as Sara Crewe (Sumi Shimamoto in the Japanese dub)
 Miriam Margolyes as Miss Amelia Minchin
 Annette Badland as Cook
 Natalie Abbott as Becky
 Alison Reynolds as Ermengarde
 Katrina Heath as Lavinia
 Joanna Dukes as Jessie
 Johanna Hargreaves	as Henrietta
 Jessica Simpson as Lottie
 Nigel Havers as Carrisford
 David Yelland as Ralph Crewe
 John Bird as Mr. Carmichael
 Annie Lambert as Mrs. Carmichael
 Antony Zaki as Ram Dass
 Meera Syal as Anna

Awards
Winner:
 1987 - BAFTA Award for Best Children's Programme (Entertainment/Drama)

Further reading
 Knoepflmacher, U.C. "Introduction". In A Little Princess by Frances Hodgson Burnett. New York: Penguin, 2002
 Shales, Tom. "Princess Charming". The Washington Post, 21 February 1987.

References

External links
 
 
 
 A Little Princess at Amazon Prime/IMDb TV
 

Television shows based on American novels
Television shows based on British novels
Films based on A Little Princess
1987 British television series debuts
1987 British television series endings
1980s British drama television series
1980s British television miniseries
Television shows set in India
Television shows set in the British Raj
Television series about bullying
ITV television dramas
Television series by ITV Studios
London Weekend Television shows
English-language television shows